Devin Dreeshen (born 1987/1988) is a Canadian politician. A member of the United Conservative Party, Dreeshen was the Minister of Agriculture and Forestry from April 30, 2019 until his resignation on November 5, 2021 due to rumours of alcohol usage within his office. Dreeshen currently represents the electoral district of Innisfail-Sylvan Lake since winning a by-election in July 2018. He was reelected in the 2019 Alberta general election to the 30th Alberta Legislature and on April 30, 2019, was appointed by Premier Jason Kenney to the Executive Council of Alberta as the Minister of Agriculture and Forestry.

Early life
Dreeshen was born in Innisfail, Alberta. His father, Earl Dreeshen, is a Conservative member of parliament for Red Deer—Mountain View, first elected in 2008.

Before entering politics himself, Dreeshen studied economics and political science at the University of Alberta. He was also a director of the right-wing lobbying group Western Canadian Wheat Growers Association, and a board member on the Crossroads Agricultural Society.

From 2008 until 2015, Dreeshen worked as a policy advisor to Minister of Agriculture Gerry Ritz.

Political career

Donald Trump presidential campaign 
Between February and November 2016 Dreeshen worked on Donald Trump's presidential campaign. Dreeshen visited 28 states and shadowed Ivanka Trump. As a result of his work, Dreeshen was invited to the Trump's victory party in New York City, where he was photographed wearing a red MAGA hat. His press secretary, Justin Laurence, said in an email that the Minister denounced all forms of political violence during the 2021 storming of the United States Capitol. On January 6, 2021, prior to press secretary's announcement, the Minister blocked so many Twitter users who asked for comment on or condemnation of the terrorist actions taking place in Washington that the hashtag "BlockedByDreeshan" became a top trend in Alberta.

United Conservative Party 
Dreeshen won the United Conservative nomination for Innisfail-Sylvan Lake in 2018, and won the ensuing by-election with approximately 80% of the vote. He was appointed by Jason Kenney as the Opposition Critic for Trade and was a member on the Standing Committee on Alberta's Economic Future. After winning reelection in the 2019 Alberta general election, he was appointed as the Minister of Agriculture and Forestry.

In October 2021, a report by the CBC revealed that a former UCP staff member had reported Dreeshen multiple times for excessive drinking and aggressive conduct in the workplace, leading to his resignation from his ministry on 5 November.

Cargill meat processing plant COVID-19 outbreak 
On April 13, 2020, the union representing employees of the Cargill meat processing plant called for the plant to be shut down due to 38 confirmed cases of COVID-19 among plant workers. On April 16, Rachel Notley called on Dreeshen and the provincial government to shut down the plant to create a safe working place; Dreeshen responded, calling her statement "misinformation and fear-mongering." During a virtual town hall meeting on April 18, Dreeshen assured plant employees that the Cargill plant has taken all necessary measures to mitigate risk to its staff. By April 20, 484 cases had been linked to the Cargill plant outbreak, at which point the plant closed for two weeks. On May 11, after the plant had reopened, NDP labour critic Christina Gray called on Dreeshen to close the plant again, but the plant remained open. Three deaths were linked with the outbreak at the Cargill plant, and at more than 1500 confirmed cases, it was the largest outbreak of COVID-19 in Canada.

Documents obtained by the Alberta Federation of Labour in March 2021 showed that Dreeshen was aware that the safety measures taken by the plant were not sufficient to ensure worker safety, but deliberately omitted the information at the town hall meeting with plant workers.

Electoral results

References

Living people
Farmers from Alberta
21st-century Canadian politicians
University of Alberta alumni
United Conservative Party MLAs
1988 births
People from Innisfail, Alberta